Sod (also Scioto) is an unincorporated community in northeastern Lincoln County, West Virginia, United States.  It lies along West Virginia Route 214 east of the town of Hamlin, the county seat of Lincoln County.  Sod's elevation is 781 feet (238 m).  It has a post office with the ZIP code 25564.

Sod is a part of the Huntington-Ashland, WV-KY-OH, Metropolitan Statistical Area (MSA). As of the 2010 census, the MSA had a population of 287,702. New definitions from February 28, 2013 placed the population at 363,000.

References

Unincorporated communities in Lincoln County, West Virginia
Unincorporated communities in West Virginia